Christopher Bowers-Broadbent is an English organist and composer.

Biography
Christopher Bowers-Broadbent was born on 13 January 1945.

He was a chorister in the Choir of King's College, Cambridge, and went on to study organ and composition at the Royal Academy of Music, where he was taught by Arnold Richardson and Richard Rodney Bennett. His made his debut at the Camden Festival in 1966; his first major recitals were at the St Albans International Organ Festival in 1969 and the Royal Festival Hall in 1971. His first appearance as a soloist was at the Proms in 1972. He was a Fellow and Professor of Organ at the Royal Academy of Music from 1973 to 1992, where his students included Kevin Bowyer.

He has recorded CDs as an organist, and with the Hilliard Ensemble. He has also appeared with Paul Hillier's Theatre of Voices. Arvo Pärt's Puzzle was written for him in celebration of his birthday. He has composed a great deal of vocal music, as well as instrumental and orchestral works.

He holds two posts in London: organist and choirmaster of Gray's Inn, one of the four Inns of Court, and organist at the West London Synagogue. This allows him the use of their Harrison & Harrison and Mander organs.

Christopher Bowers-Broadbent is the father of musician Harry Broadbent.

Compositions

Choral

1968 Four Lovescapes Canticles (E.E. Cummings)
1972 Worthy is the Lamb Cantata
1974 The Hollow Man (T.S. Eliot)
1975 Rhymes without Reason four songs (Mervyn Peake)
1976 The Story of Cars a short cantata
1978 Deo Gratias a motet
1981 The Quarry a short cantata (W.H. Auden)
1989 Jubilate-Cantate
1999 Holy Communion service for Gray's Inn

Canticles

Evening Canticles

1968 Festal setting
1968 Lenten setting
1976 in Two Parts
1988 Ex-St Pancras

Morning Canticles

1972 Te Deum (ICET text)
1975 Te Deum
1971 Short communion service
1973 Communion Service (Series III text)
1981 A New Benedicite (Leonard Clark)

Anthems

1965 2 Short Motets
1966 Brief life
1968 No time ago
1968 Offer your very selves
1968 Into this world of sorrow
1969 Virgin Born
1969 Music to Hear
1969 Pleasure it is
1969 The way to Life
1970 Pater noster
1970 Except the Lord
1970 Let thy merciful ears
1971 I thank you God
1976 The grace of God
1977 There is water in the river
1995 Yiheyu leratson
1994 The Elixir
1994 Hail bright Cecilia
1996 Since I
1997 Hashivenu
1997 Office Hymns
1997 All praise
1997 Az Yashir Mosheh (The Song of Moses)

Christmas music

1963/1970 Sleep Holy Babe
1965 Matin Responsory
1971 A spotless rose
1973 There is no rose
1977 If Christ were born in Camden (A.F. Bayly)
1978 If Christ were born in London
1984 A Christmas Litany (Fred Kaan)
1985 A Christmas Song (Laurence Housman)
1991 Angelus ad Virginem
1999 As with gladness
2002 Alleluia: A new work is come on hand

Instrumental

1966 Dialogue and Controversy for brass and organ
1967 Serenatas for oboe
1967 Dogmas for brass quartet and timpani
1968 Duo for flute and violin
1970 3 Duets for flute
1970 Fantasia for lute
1975 Little Concerto for oboe and string orchestra
1979 Piece for E-flat clarinet
2000 A Ship bound for Tarshish for chamber orchestra
2001 The Song at the Sea for organ, strings and timpani

Organ

1964 Variations
1966 Four Diversions
1968 Six Pieces
1968 Serenata
1994 PreluDDe
1996 Media vita - a sequence of short pieces
1996 Duets and canons - a sequence of short pieces (recorded by Kevin Bowyer)
1997 Ya Shema
2000 Organ Notebook 1
2002 7 Words - a piece in 7 movements

Chamber operas

1972 The Pied Piper (a children's opera) - libretto by Jeremy Hornsby
1979 The Seacock Bane (for teenagers) - libretto by Tony Vincent Isaacs
1982 The Last Man (a comic opera) - libretto by Tony Vincent Isaacs

Songs and incidental music

1969 The Becauseway a play by Wesley Burrowes
1971 And All The People Rejoiced a play by Wesley Burrowes
1982 The Three Brothers a story for shadow puppets by Jessica Souhami

References

20th-century classical composers
21st-century classical composers
Academics of the Royal Academy of Music
Alumni of the Royal Academy of Music
Composers for pipe organ
English classical composers
Male opera composers
Living people
1945 births
20th-century English composers
20th-century British male musicians
21st-century British male musicians
Choristers of the Choir of King's College, Cambridge